Roberto Moreira Linck Junior (born 31 July 1988 in Cachoeira do Sul), nicknamed Betu, is a Brazilian-born American footballer and filmmaker. He is the owner of Linck Group and Miami Dade FC.

Youth and college
Linck grew up playing in the youth system of Gremio in Brazil, before moving to United States. He was a player for the Olympic Development Program, Region IV Team. He played for Park City High School in 2006 where he won a state title in his senior year. Linck joined the Irvine Valley College in 2007 and was the starting midfielder during his years with the school.

Career

Soccer
On 30 July 2010, Linck was signed by the New England Revolution of the Major League Soccer, a day prior to his 22nd birthday. He made his professional debut for the New England Revolution coming on for Khano Smith in the 80th minute in the team's 1–0 victory over DC United on 8 August 2010. He was released by New England on 28 February 2011. Due to an injury suffered to his hamstring he was forced to stop playing soccer in 2011.
On 20 May 2014 Linck returned to play soccer and was signed by the Miami Dade FC to play as a striker.
He made his debut with Miami Dade FC scoring 1 goal on the 83rd minute of the match.

Business
Linck is the owner of Linck Group, an American investment company that owns Miami Dade FC, and Ginga Scout.

In 2014, Linck Group acquired the company Conttratta. Conttratta represents and is responsible for the image of artists and sports figures such as Claudia Alende, Naldo Benny, Laura Rizzotto, Edgaras Jankauskas, Roberto Carlos da Silva, Fabio Simplicio and Emerson Ferreira da Rosa.

Linck was the founder of Miami Dade FC, an American soccer club. In the first year of the club, they were crowned champions of the NAL. Played two international friendly matches against the Brazil champions Cruzeiro, competed in an international tournament in Colombia and won an award from the United Nations.
On 3 November 2015, former Brazil capitain Emerson Ferreira da Rosa announced that he was joining Miami Dade FC.

On 1 November 2015, alongside his partner Roberto Carlos, they launched Ginga Scout, a soccer software application to help connect players with scouts from around the globe.

On 22 February 2017 Linck Group acquired the shoe factory Moeller Design. With over 250 employees, the shoe factory produces 2,700 pairs daily.

Film and TV career

In 2017 Linck wrote and directed his debut short film, Lock All Doors, the film stars model Claudia Alende.

He was feature in the television show FIFA Football, episode 126, together with Louis Saha and Emerson Ferreira da Rosa.

Linck directed the TV Series Camino Al Gol, in which soccer scouts travel through Colombia to pick 1 winner out of 5,000 trialists.

In 2022, Linck played the role of the Doctor in the psychological thriller Unfelt along side National Treasure actor Timothy V. Murphy.

Video Games

Linck is featured along with his Major League Soccer teammates in the EA Sport's FIFA video game series in FIFA 11. He was also feature in Football Manager 2011.

Charitable work
Linck is a founding member of the Soccer Mission group. He helped launch the charity group in 2014. Their first work was on Thanksgiving Day with a half-dozen of the Miami Dade FC team's players and staff, they spent an afternoon making pasta at the Fort Lauderdale factory of Spaghetto, which manufactures fresh pasta, to then cook and donate to over 150 homeless.

On 5 July 2015, United Nations presented Linck with an award for peace against drugs and offense. The charity event was held in Barranquilla, Colombia at Estadio Metropolitano in front of 15,000 fans.

Linck is a board of director of Friends of Soccer Dreamers, a nonprofit corporation based in the Silicon Valley. Other known board members include Redpoint Ventures partner Tom Dyal and former Olympic medalist André Luiz Moreira. On 20 December 2018 the nonprofit corporation donated 500 pairs of soccer shoes to low-income youth in Brazil.

Personal life
Linck has an unusual background for a MLS player having trained through the youth system of Brazil's Gremio Football Porto Alegrense which schooled Ronaldinho, and then playing college soccer in California, professional indoor soccer for the Chicago Storm, and a season with CSM Ramnicu Valcea in Romania. He is the son of former Rede Globo anchorwoman Alessandra Linck. He has a younger sister, Tatiana. He currently resides in Miami, Florida.

His great-grandfather (Aurélio de Lima Py) was the founder of the Federacao Gaucha de Futebol and the founder, first patron and 9 times president of world champion Grêmio.

Linck's family also created the Projeto Pescar, "The Fishing Project" (The name was inspired by the proverb: "Give a man a fish and you feed him for a day. Teach a man to fish and you feed him for a lifetime.") Is a non-profit initiative supported by companies with the intention to prepare low-income youth for social inclusion in the labor market. During the course young people learn about some professional area according to the branch that the company works as well as guidance on: Citizenship, environment, sex education, family and technology. The project began in 1976 in Rio Grande do Sul, Brazil, with the initiative of the entrepreneur Geraldo Tollens Linck (1927–1998), owner of Linck SA.

Filmography

Films and TV

Honours

Chicago Storm

USL Champion 2009

New England Revolution

North American SuperLiga Runners-up (2nd Place) 2010

Miami Dade FC

NAL – Champion (2014)

United Nations Award – UNODC Respira Paz (2015)

APSL – Regular Season Champion (2016)

APSL – Regular Season Champion (2017)

APSL – APSL Champion (2017)

Svema Karlstad Trophy Sweden – Runners-up (2nd Place) (2019)

Top Tour Mexico - Champion (2021)

National Soccer League - Champions (2022)

I'm Good at Being Bad (Music Video)
Special Mention Award at the Asia South East-Short Film Festival (2018)

References

External links

Living people
1988 births
Brazilian footballers
New England Revolution players
SCM Râmnicu Vâlcea players
Chicago Storm players
Miami Dade FC players
Expatriate soccer players in the United States
Brazilian expatriate footballers
Brazilian people of German descent
Sportspeople from Rio Grande do Sul
Major League Soccer players
Brazilian emigrants to the United States
Association football midfielders